Potassium intermediate/small conductance calcium-activated channel, subfamily N, member 1 , also known as KCNN1 is a human gene encoding the KCa2.1 protein.

Action potentials in vertebrate neurons are followed by an afterhyperpolarization (AHP) that may persist for several seconds and may have profound consequences for the firing pattern of the neuron. Each component of the AHP is kinetically distinct and is mediated by different calcium-activated potassium channels. The protein encoded by this gene is activated before membrane hyperpolarization and is thought to regulate neuronal excitability by contributing to the slow component of synaptic AHP. The KCa2.1 protein is an integral membrane protein that forms a voltage-independent calcium-activated channel with three other calmodulin-binding subunits. The KCNN1 gene is a member of the KCNN family of potassium channel genes.

See also
 SK channel
 Voltage-gated potassium channel

References

Further reading

Ion channels